William L. Thorne (October 14, 1878 in Fresno, California – March 10, 1948 in Fresno, California) was an American film actor.

On Broadway, Thorne appeared in The Tavern (1921) and Big Boy (1925).

Partial filmography

 The Kick Off (1926)
 Thunderbolt (1929) - Police Inspector
 The Drake Case (1929) - Captain Condon
 Peacock Alley (1930) - Dugan
 Abraham Lincoln (1930) - Tom Lincoln (as W. L. Thorne)
 The Lash (1930) - Landlord of the Bella Union Cantina (uncredited)
 Fighting Thru (1930) - Ace Brady
 Finger Prints (1931, Serial) - Joe Burke
 The She-Wolf (1931) - detective Burke
 The Montana Kid (1931) - Chuck Larson
 Danger Island (1931, Serial) - Bull Black
 The Rainbow Trail (1932) - King Dyer
 Vanishing Men (1932) - Bat Morrison
 Law of the North (1932) - Judge Hanley
 Clancy of the Mounted (1933) - Black MacDougal
 Pirate Treasure (1934) - Drake
 The Whole Town's Talking (1935) - Policeman (uncredited)
 Night Life of the Gods (1935) - Detective (uncredited)
 The Roaring West (1935) - Marco Brett
 Nevada (1935) - Poker player
 Paradise Express (1937) - Farmer at meeting (uncredited)
 The Gold Racket (1937) - McKenzie
 Bank Alarm (1937) - Police Inspector J.C. Macy
 Love Takes Flight (1937) - Bill Parker Sr.
 The Man Who Dared (1939) - Fire Chief (uncredited)
 The Forgotten Woman (1939) - Policeman (uncredited)
 The Man from Sundown (1939) - Sam Cooper (uncredited) (final film role)

References

External links

New York Times review of film The She Wolf also known as Mother's Millions
New York Times review of film Thunderbolt

1878 births
1948 deaths
20th-century American male actors
American male film actors
American male silent film actors
Male actors from Fresno, California
Male Western (genre) film actors